Li Tang may refer to:

Li Tang (painter) (1050–1130), Chinese landscape painter in the Song Dynasty
Li Tang (hall of worship), place to perform religious rituals and to learn the teachings of Confucius
Tang Dynasty (618 – 907), an imperial dynasty of China